Chinmay Mandlekar (born 2 February 1979) is an Indian actor, writer and stage director, mostly active in the Marathi entertainment industry. He is known for his work in Zenda, Morya, Farzand (2018), Fatteshikast (2019), The Kashmir Files (2022) and Pawankhind (2022). He has also completed many episodes of a crime series (Crime Patrol) as SI Rajesh Jadhav.

Biography 

A graduate of the National School of Drama, Mandlekar has written, directed or acted in successful plays such as Bechaki and Sukhanshi Bhandto Aamhi.

In films, Mandlekar is active as an actor and a writer, having starred in Marathi movies like Zenda, Morya or Gajaar: Journey of the Soul. On the small screen, his role opposite Mrunal Dusanis in the hit TV serial Tu Tithe Me turned him into a household name in Maharashtra. In 2017, he was part of Marathi film Halal, directed by Shivaji Lotan Patil and produced by Amol Kagne.

Mandlekar has also had supporting roles in Hindi movies, such as Tere Bin Laden and Shanghai. He is married and has 2 children, a daughter and a son. In 2017, Chimay Mandlekar was a part of Marathi TV Series Sakhya Re on Colors Marathi.
He played the lead role of Saint Tukaram in Marathi serial Tu Maza Sangati. From 2020 to 2021, he wrote and produced Marathi series Chandra Aahe Sakshila that aired on Colors Marathi. From September 2021, he wrote and produced Dyaneshwar Mauli for Sony Marathi under his production house Mulakshar Productions.

Filmography

Films

Television

References

External links
 

Marathi actors
Indian male film actors
Indian theatre directors
1982 births
Living people
Male actors in Marathi television